The list of Karnataka Rajyotsava Award recipients for the year 2010 is below.

References

Rajyotsava Award
Recipients of the Rajyotsava Award 2010